Pseudomonas parafulva is a Gram-negative bacteria. It is epiphytic and has been demonstrated to antagonise the fungal plant pathogen Botrytis cinerea.

References

External links
Type strain of Pseudomonas parafulva at BacDive -  the Bacterial Diversity Metadatabase

Pseudomonadales
Bacteria described in 2001